Daniel Arsand (born 9 July 1950 in Avignon) is a French writer as well as a publisher specializing in foreign literature.

Biography 

Finally, in 2000, he became a publisher of foreign literature at Éditions Phébus.

He made his debut as a writer in 1989 with a biography of Mireille Balin but his career as a novelist began in 1998 with La Province des ténèbres, a noticed work that earned him the prix Femina for first novel. This author, whom Michel Crépu, in L'Express dated 28 September 2000, dubbed "Arsand, the wild classic" because of the contrast between the harshness of his themes and the sobriety of his style, later published several novels and short stories, including En silence, which obtained the Grand prix Jean Giono for second novel.

At the same time, his role as a publisher is above all that of a "passer" ', that is to say a reader who allows the French-speaking public to discover foreign authors. In this sense, Daniel Arsand is the "passer" of William Trevor but also of three other Irish writers: Keith Ridgway (prix Femina étranger 2001), Hugo Hamilton (prix Femina étranger 2003) and Joseph O'Connor. He also had the Turkish novelist Elif Shafak's works translated.

He is the publisher of Certaines n'avaient jamais vu la mer by Julie Otsuka which was awarded the prix Femina étranger in 2012.

Works 
1989: Mireille Balin ou la beauté foudroyée, La Manufacture de livres
1996: Nocturnes, HB Éditeur
1998: La Province des ténèbres, Phébus, prix Femina for first novel
2000: En silence, Phébus, 2000, Grand prix Jean Giono of second novel.
2000: La Ville assiégée, Éditions du Rocher
2002: Lily, Phébus
2004: Ivresses du fils, Stock
2006: Des chevaux noirs, Stock
2008: Des amants, Stock, Grand prix  of the Société des gens de lettres.
2008: Alberto, 
2011: , prix  of European novel 
2013: Que Tal. Phébus
2016: Je suis en vie et tu ne m’entends pas, Actes Sud,

References

External links 
 Je suis en vie et tu ne l'entends pas by Daniel Arsand on La Croix (23 June 2016)
 Daniel Arsand on Babelio
 Biography on the site of the Société des Gens de Lettres
 Daniel Arsand : Opposer une parole au silence on Le Monde (22 September 2011)
 Daniel Arsand on France Culture

1950 births
Writers from Avignon
Living people
20th-century French non-fiction writers
20th-century French male writers
21st-century French non-fiction writers
Publishers (people) from Paris
Prix Femina winners
Chevaliers of the Ordre des Arts et des Lettres
Grand prix Jean Giono recipients
Businesspeople from Avignon